The University of Durban-Westville (UDW) was a university situated in Westville, a town situated near Durban, South Africa, which opened in 1972. It is now one of the campuses of the University of KwaZulu-Natal. It was initially established for Indians, as during apartheid there were few universities that admitted non-White students. Prior to the building of UDW, Indian students traveled by ferry to a facility at Salisbury Island, which had been established in 1961 as the University College for Indians UDW offered degrees in commerce, the arts, law, engineering, and health sciences and sciences in general. Later  an indoor sports centre was built, which hosted national sporting events. UDW was the hub of many student anti-apartheid political rallies.

Campaign of intimidation
In 1995 it was reported that staff members had been subjected to death threats, violence, break-ins to their homes and offices and smear campaigns by other staff members.

Merger
On 1 January 2004 the university was merged with the University of Natal to create the University of KwaZulu-Natal, as part of a broader reorganisation of South African universities.

Notable alumni
 Malusi Gigaba, Former Minister of Home Affairs in South Africa
 Pravin Gordhan, Minister of Finance
 Karthy Govender, commissioner for South African Human Rights Commission
 Quarraisha Karim, prominent HIV prevention expert
 Roy Padayachie, Minister of Public Service and Administration in the South Africa
 Kgosientso Ramokgopa, Executive Mayor of the City of Tshwane in 2010

References

Universities in KwaZulu-Natal
University of KwaZulu-Natal
Defunct universities and colleges in South Africa
Educational institutions established in 1972
Educational institutions disestablished in 2004
1972 establishments in South Africa
2004 disestablishments in South Africa